The 2016 KPN Bangkok Open II was a professional tennis tournament played on hard courts. It was the first edition of the tournament which was part of the 2016 ATP Challenger Tour. It took place in Bangkok, Thailand between 11 and 17 January 2016.

Singles main-draw entrants

Seeds

 1 Rankings are as of January 4, 2016.

Other entrants
The following players received wildcards into the singles main draw:
  Nattan Benjasupawan
  Sonchat Ratiwatana
  Wishaya Trongcharoenchaikul
  Kittipong Wachiramanowong

The following player received protected ranking entry into the singles main draw:
  Roman Safiullin
 
The following players received entry from the qualifying draw:
  Cheong-Eui Kim
  Joshua Milton
  Maximilian Neuchrist 
  Frederik Nielsen 
 
The following player received entry as a lucky loser:
  Benjamin Balleret

Champions

Singles

  Mikhail Youzhny def.  Adam Pavlásek 6–4, 6–1

Doubles

  Wesley Koolhof /  Matwé Middelkoop def.  Gero Kretschmer /  Alexander Satschko 6–3, 7–6(7–1)

External links

 
 ATP Challenger Tour
Tennis, ATP Challenger Tour, KPN Bangkok Open II
Tennis, ATP Challenger Tour, KPN Bangkok Open II

Tennis, ATP Challenger Tour, KPN Bangkok Open II